The Tren Turístico de la Sabana or Turistren runs heritage trains in Bogota, Colombia. The company runs steam trains from Bogota (Sabana railway station) to Parque and Zipaquira.

History
The idea of tourist trains with steam locomotives in Bogota was born 1982. When the National Railways in Colombia stopped running trains in 1990, people with knowledge of the railway, started to renovate a steam locomotive and carriages for a tourist railway. In 1992, the private company "Turistren Ltda" was founded by four friends, and a contract with the National Railways was made to use the tracks for running tourist trains. In 1993, railway tours started with steam locomotives under the name "Tren Turístico de la Sabana".

Route
The  gauge line runs up the central reservation of Carrera 9, with numerous level crossings at the intersections.

The idea has been discussed of upgrading the line to provide commuter services.

Gallery

See also
 Bogotá Savannah Railway
 Rail transport in Colombia

References

External links
 Turistren (Spanish)
 Turistren (English)

Heritage railways in Colombia